Aurizon Holdings Limited is a freight rail transport company in Australia, formerly named QR National Limited and branded QR National.   it was the world’s largest rail transporter of coal from mine to port.  Formerly a Queensland Government-owned company, it was privatised and floated on the Australian Securities Exchange (ASX) in November 2010. The company was originally established in 200405 when the coal, bulk, and container transport divisions from Queensland Rail were brought under one banner as QR National.

Aurizon also managed the  Central Queensland coal network that links mines to coal ports at Bowen, Gladstone and Mackay; it was the largest haulier of iron ore outside the Pilbara.

In 2021, a major corporate change was foreshadowed when Aurizon sought to acquire rail operator One Rail Australia. The corporate regulator, the Australian Competition and Consumer Commission, approved the sale subject to One Rail Australia's coal-haulage business in New South Wales and Queensland being divested. Aurizon's purchase of One Rail Australia's assets not subject to divestiture occurred in July 2022. Divestiture of the remaining assets occurred on sale to Magnetic Rail Group on 17 February 2023.

QR National

The QR National brand was established in the 2004–05 financial year when Queensland Rail's coal, bulk and containerised business units were brought under one banner. 

The company's major traffic at the time was coal, both for export and domestic power generation, in Queensland. In 2005, QR National started to operate export coal services in the New South Wales Hunter Valley. By 2008, its operations extended across the entire mainland other than the Northern Territory when their first Melbourne–Perth intermodal container service started. In August 2008, QR National took over the operation of Melbourne–Horsham container service for Wimmera Container Line, after Pacific National withdrew its service.

Public float

In 2009, the Queensland Government announced that Queensland Rail's commercial activities were to be separated from the government's core passenger service responsibilities, formed into a new company named QR National Limited, and privatised. The new company was incorporated the following year, taking: 
 the coal business in Queensland and New South Wales
 regional freight business in Queensland
 bulk mineral and grain haulage in Queensland and Western Australia
 containerised freight between Cairns, Brisbane, Sydney, Melbourne, Adelaide and Perth.

QR National obtained a 99-year lease over the  Queensland coal network, comprising:
 the Blackwater system around the Port of Gladstone
 the Goonyella system around the Port of Hay Point and Dalrymple Bay
 the Moura line to the Port of Gladstone, which transports coal from Moura Mine and Boundary Hill Mine
 the Newlands line to Port of Abbot Point, which transports coal from Newlands coal mine, Sonoma Mine and Collinsville coal mine
 the West Moreton coal line, which transports coal to the Port of Brisbane from New Acland coal mine (loaded at Jondaryan and the Cameby Downs coal mine (loaded at Columboola, utilising in part the QR Western Railway Line.

On acquiring the lease, QR National bcame responsible for the maintenance of the coal lines.

The rolling stock workshops at Redbank, Rockhampton and Townsville were included in the privatisation.

The float took place in November 2010.

Re-branding as Aurizon
Following a vote by its shareholders, in 2012 QR National was rebranded as Aurizon. The CEO at the time, Lance Hockridge, said the new name derived from the words Australia and horizon. Marketers opined that the name was "a nearly perfect example of all that can go wrong with a rebranding" and that it was "a classic case of people making a weird hybrid name to try and make it unique and interesting so that people will remember it. This is not true: people don’t remember made-up words."

Company sales and purchases
In 2005, QR National incorporated a subsidiary, Interail, which had been acquired in 2002 and operated in New South Wales.

In the same year, QR National acquired logistics company CRT Group, for which it already provided line haulage.

In 2006, QR National acquired Australian Railroad Group (ARG), which operated in New South Wales, South Australia and Western Australia. ARG remained a separate subsidiary operation until it was rebranded as QR National in 2011.

In 2007, the company acquired the Golden Bros Group.

In 2019, after a Federal Court judgement, Aurizon's intermodal and trucking business was acquired by Linfox for A$7.3 million.

In October 2021, Aurizon agreed terms to purchase One Rail Australia. The transaction was approved in July 2022 by the Australian Competition & Consumer Commission (ACCC) after the commission accepted Aurizon's court-enforceable undertaking to dispose of the seller's Hunter Valley coal haulage and Queensland coal haulage business to maintain competition levels. The ACCC Chair, Gina Cass-Gottlieb, said: "We are also satisfied that the divestment of One Rail’s east coast business would preserve it as a potential competitor to Aurizon for the supply of non-coal bulk rail haulage in the future, and Aurizon would continue to be constrained by a number of existing bulk rail haulage competitors.” The sale was completed on 29 July 2022, and Aurizon took over One Rail Australia's South Australian, Northern Territory and interstate operations the following day under the brand, "Aurizon Bulk Central".

In December 2022, Aurizon agreed to an offer by Magnetic Rail Group Pty Ltd to purchase the divested assets. The buyer was to pay about $A425 million ($US284.3 million) – the equity value of ECR – and assume existing debt facilities, which originally totalled $A500 million. Proceeds, $A125 million of which was to be deferred for 12 months, would be used initially to reduce Aurizon's debt and would form part of Aurizon's available capital. After the ACCC gave regulatory approval, the sale was completed on 17 February 2023.

Price regulation
As Aurizon's infrastructure was a monopoly, it was subject in 2018 to regulation by government organisations including the Queensland Competition Authority.  Aurizon disputed the price that it should be allowed to charge its clients – for example when the Autority used a lower weighted average cost of capital that did not account for the risk that clean energy poses to fossil fuel.

Scope after purchase of One Rail Australia
In February 2022, Aurizon commenced a five-year contract to haul mineral sands from Broken Hill to Kwinana for Tronox, to be extended 320 km east to Ivanhoe, where a new loading facility has been constructed.

In February 2023, Aurizon re-entered the interstate intermodal market on being awarded a  billion 11-year contract with Team Global Express (formerly Toll Global Express) – the largest non-coal contract in the history of the company. The company stated that services would begin in April 2023 and that by April 2024, five weekly services would run east–west (Melbourne–Sydney–Adelaide–Perth); two would run north–south (Brisbane–Sydney–Melbourne).

On the 3rd of March 2023, Aurizon and Viterra submitted a formal application to the Australian Federal Government for A$220 million in funding to repair and upgrade the Eyre Peninsula Railway lines. The proposal includes re-opening the Port Lincoln-Wudinna and Cummins-Kimba lines, upgrades to the outloading facilities at Viterra’s Lock,  Wudinna, Cummins, Kimba and Rudall sites with a target of at least 1.3mt of grain to be hauled by rail per year. Aurizon and Viterra plan to have the network reopened within 12 months if funding is approved.

Locomotive fleet
Details of Aurizon's current locomotive fleet are as follows:

Former fleet 
Details of Aurizon's former fleet are as follows:

References

 
Interstate rail in Australia
Privatisation in Australia
Freight railway companies of Australia
Railway companies established in 2004
Railway infrastructure companies of Australia
Transport in Queensland
Companies listed on the Australian Securities Exchange
Australian companies established in 2004
Companies based in Brisbane